Lambton is the name of several places and people:

People
 Viscount Lambton, a title in the Peerage of the United Kingdom associated with the Earls of Durham
Anne Lambton (born 1954), an actress
Antony Lambton (1922–2006), formerly 6th Earl of Durham and later claimed Viscount Lambton, disclaimed his earldom under the terms of the Peerage Act 1963
Edward Lambton, 7th Earl of Durham (born 1961), or Ned Lambton, is the current Earl of Durham
Frederick Lambton, 4th Earl of Durham (1855–1929), a British politician
George Lambton, 2nd Earl of Durham (1828–1879), a British peer
Hedworth Lambton (1856–1929), a British naval officer, changed his name to Hedworth Meux in 1910 for inheritance purposes
John Lambton (1710–1794), a British army officer and Member of Parliament
John Lambton, 1st Earl of Durham (1792–1840), a British colonial administrator
John Lambton, 3rd Earl of Durham (1855–1928), a British peer
John Lambton, 5th Earl of Durham (1884–1970), a British peer
Lucinda Lambton, writer, photographer and broadcaster
William Henry Lambton (1764–1797), a British Member of Parliament
William Lambton (c.1756–1823), surveyor

Places

Australia
Lambton, New South Wales, a suburb in Newcastle, New South Wales
New Lambton, New South Wales, a suburb in Newcastle, New South Wales

Canada
Lambton County, Ontario
Lambton (electoral district), a former Federal riding that encompassed Lambton County
Lambton (provincial electoral district), a former Provincial riding
Lambton College, Sarnia (Lambton County), Ontario
Lambton Neighbourhood, Toronto, neighbourhood in Toronto 
Lambton, Québec, a municipality in Québec

New Zealand
Lambton Harbour, one of the arms of Wellington Harbour
Lambton Quay, Wellington, one of the main streets of Wellington
Lambton Station, also known as Pipitea Point Railway Station, Wellington

United Kingdom 
Lambton, Tyne and Wear, a village in Washington, Tyne and Wear, Sunderland, England 
Lambton Castle, a stately home near Chester-le-Street in County Durham, England 
New Lambton, County Durham, a village in England

Ships
 Lambton, a New Zealand Company cutter dispatched to New Zealand in 1825 under Captain James Herd
 SS Lambton, a lighthouse tender that operated for the Canadian government on the Great Lakes in the early 20th century

See also
Lampton